Election of the Speaker of the Chamber of Deputies of the Parliament of the Czech Republic was held on 27 June 1996. Miloš Zeman was elected the new Speaker when he defeated Jan Vik.

Background
1996 legislative election concluded with victory of governing coalition. Coalition was short of parliamentary majority and needed support of opposition Czech Social Democratic Party. Coalition offered support in Speaker election to the leader of Social Democratic Party Miloš Zeman in exchange for parliamentary support.

Voting
187 MPs were present. Zeman received 103 votes, Vik received 30 votes and 57 votes were invalid. Zeman became the new Speaker.

References

Speaker of the Chamber of Deputies of the Parliament 
1996
Speaker of the Chamber of Deputies of the Parliament of the Czech Republic election